Sebastião is a Portuguese male given name, descending from the Latin Sebastianus and equivalent to the English name Sebastian.

Notable people
Notable people with this name include:

Art
Sebastião Alba, Portuguese poet
Sebastião Tapajós, Brazilian guitarist
Sebastião Salgado, Brazilian photographer

Politics
Sebastião Custódio de Sousa Teles, Portuguese politician
Sebastião Fernandes da Costa, Portuguese lawyer and politician
Sebastião I, also known as Sebastian of Portugal, Portuguese king
Sebastião José de Carvalho e Melo, 1st Marquis of Pombal, Portuguese statesman

Religion
Sebastião Barradas, Portuguese preacher
Sebastião da Silveira Cintra, Brazilian cardinal
Sebastião Rodolfo Dalgado, Indo-Portuguese priest
Sebastião Soares de Resende, Portuguese Catholic bishop

Sport

Football
Sebastião Gilberto, Angolan footballer
Sebastião Lazaroni, Brazilian football manager
Sebastião Loureiro da Silva, Portuguese footballer
Sebastião Matateu, Portuguese footballer
Sebastião Miranda da Silva Filho, Brazilian footballer
Sebastião Nogueira, Portuguese footballer
Sebastião Pereira do Nascimento, Brazilian footballer

Other
Sebastião Amorim Gimenez, Brazilian basketball player
Sebastião Herédia, Portuguese fencer
Sebastião Wolf, Brazilian sport shooter

Other
Sebastião Rodrigues Soromenho, Portuguese explorer

References

Portuguese masculine given names